Thonne-le-Thil is a commune in the Meuse department in Grand Est in north-eastern France. The population steadily declined since a peak of nearly one thousand in the mid-1800s, being about 250 inhabitants in 2019.

See also
Communes of the Meuse department

References

Communes of Meuse (department)